Bruce Elliott Johansen (born January 30, 1950) is an American academic and author. He is the Frederick W. Kayser Professor of Communication at the University of Nebraska at Omaha and is the author or editor of many books and articles, notably on environmental and Native American issues.

Life and career
Johansen was born in San Diego, California, where his father served as a United States Coast Guard officer. He received his B.A. degree from University of Washington in 1972 and his M.A. from University of Minnesota in 1975. From 1972 to 1976 he also worked as reporter for the Seattle Times. Johansen received his PhD from University of Washington in 1979. His doctoral dissertation, Franklin, Jefferson and American Indians: a study in the cross-cultural communication of ideas, formed the basis of his 1982 book Forgotten Founders: How the American Indian Helped Shape Democracy. In 1982 Johansen joined the faculty of University of Nebraska at Omaha where he is the Kayser Professor of Communication. In 2011, Johansen was awarded the Isaacson Professorship by the university.

Johansen was lifelong friends with Roberto Maestas (July 9, 1938 – September 22, 2010), founder of El Centro de la Raza, a Latino community rights organization in Seattle.

Publications

 Encyclopedia of the American Indian Movement (Greenwood Publishing, 2013) , part of the Movements of the American Mosaic series
 The Iroquois (Chelsea House, 2010) , part of the 14 volume History and Culture of Native Americans series
 Native Americans Today: A Biographical Dictionary (Greenwood Publishing, 2010) 
 The Encyclopedia of Global Warming Science and Technology, 2 volumes (Greenwood Publishing, 2009) 
 Global Warming 101 (Greenwood Publishing, 2008) , part of the Science 101 series
 The Global Warming Combat Manual: Solutions for a Sustainable World (Praeger Publishing, 2008) 
 with Barry M. Pritzker, Encyclopedia of American Indian History, 4 volumes (ABC-CLIO, 2007) 
 Silenced!: Academic Freedom, Scientific Inquiry, and the First Amendment under Siege in America (Praeger Publishing, 2007) 
 The Praeger Handbook on Contemporary Issues in Native America, 2 volumes (Praeger Publishing, 2007) , part of the Native America: Yesterday and Today series
 Global Warming in the 21st Century, 3 volumes (Praeger Publishing, 2006) 
 The Native Peoples of North America: A History (Rutgers University Press, 2006) paperback: 
 The Native Peoples of North America: A History, 2 volumes (Praeger Publishing, 2005) 
 Enduring Legacies: Native American Treaties and Contemporary Controversies (Praeger Publishing, 2004) 
 Indigenous Peoples and Environmental Issues: An Encyclopedia (Greenwood Publishing, 2003) 
 The Dirty Dozen: Toxic Chemicals and the Earth's Future (Praeger Publishing, 2003) 
 The Global Warming Desk Reference (Greenwood Publishing, 2001) 
 with Barbara Alice Mann, Encyclopedia of the Haudenosaunee (Iroquois Confederacy) (Greenwood Publishing, 2000) 
 Shapers of the Great Debate on Native Americans--Land, Spirit, and Power: A Biographical Dictionary (Greenwood Publishing, 2000) 
 Native America and the Evolution of Democracy: A Supplementary Bibliography (Greenwood Publishing, 1999) , part of the Bibliographies and Indexes in American History series
 The Encyclopedia of Native American Economic History (Greenwood Publishing, 1999) 
 The Encyclopedia of Native American Legal Tradition (Greenwood Publishing, 1998) 
 with Donald A. Grinde, Jr., The Encyclopedia Of Native American Biography: Six Hundred Life Stories of Important People, From Powhatan to Wilma Mankillerpaperback: (Da Capo Press, 1998) hardcover: (Henry Holt & Co., 1997) 
 with Donald A. Grinde Jr. & Barbara Alice Mann, Debating Democracy: The Iroquois Legacy of Freedom (Santa Fe: Clear Light Publishing, 1997) 
 Native American Political Systems and the Evolution of Democracy: An Annotated Bibliography (Greenwood Publishing, 1996) , part of the Bibliographies and Indexes in American History series
 So Far from Home: Manila's Santo Tomas Internment Camp, 1942–1945 (PBI Press, 1996) 
 with Donald A. Grinde Jr., foreword by Howard Zinn, Ecocide of Native America: Environmental Destruction of Indian Lands and Peoples (Santa Fe: Clear Light Publishing, 1995) 
 with John Kahionhes Fadden, Life and Death in Mohawk Country (Fulcrum Publishing, 1993) 
 with Donald A. Grinde, Jr., foreword by Vine Deloria, Jr., Exemplar of Liberty: Native America and the Evolution of Democracy (UCLA American Indian Studies Center, 1991)
 with Roberto Maestas, El Pueblo: The Gallegos Family's American Journey, 1503–1980 (Monthly Review Press, 1983) 
 Forgotten Founders: How the American Indian Helped Shape Democracy (Harvard Common Press, 1982) 
 with Roberto Maestas, Wasi'chu: The Continuing Indian Wars (Monthly Review Press, 1979)

References

External links
Johansen's articles in The News-Times
Extracts from Johansen's Indigenous Peoples and Environmental Issues: An Encyclopedia

University of Nebraska Omaha faculty
University of Washington alumni
University of Minnesota alumni
1950 births
Living people